Gregg Russell  is a nationally known singer, songwriter and actor who regularly performs on Hilton Head Island, South Carolina. He has shared the stage with such famous acts as Steve Martin, The Beach Boys, George Burns and Stephen Curtis Chapman. He has appeared at hundreds of college campuses, many major corporate conventions, family festivals and events across the nation, and is Carnival Cruise Lines' Premier Headline Entertainer.

Entertaining and Music Career 
Russell has been performing under an old oak tree in Harbour Town on Hilton Head Island every Summer for 45 years, as of 2022.  As measured by concert attendance records and YouTube hits, Russell's performances have been viewed by over three million people. Many children who watch his show sign up for the "Kid friendly Bubble Gum Cruise," which features Russell as a singer and activity leader. The cruise is intended to be family-oriented and features dolphin watching on the Calibogue Sound. Gregg also has over 30 YouTube videos and some with over 5 views.

Original Compositions
With the help of Dennis Scott, Gregg Russell wrote the music for the children's SCETV/Wardley series "Dooley and Pals."  Gregg Russell made a CD album called, "Stop, Look and Listen" which includes many of the songs from the series. He has written and performed hundreds of children's songs.  His recognitions include writing and performing original music for specials on the USA Networks, CBS and NBC.

Acting career
Gregg Russell was featured in two award winning productions, Come Away Home and Camp Tanglefoot.

Come Away Home
Come Away Home, written by Kat Shehata, is a Benjamin Franklin Award winner.  It is a film about a girl named Annie that is forced to stay with her grandfather on Hilton Head Island one summer.  The movie was filmed exclusively on Hilton Head Island during the summer of 2004 and was released in 2005. Russell made his debut as a performer who lost his family in a tragic accident and befriends Annie.  Through their friendship, they find the feeling of belonging, and overcome some similar tragedies in their family situations. This film was made by American Family Movies, Stephen M. Zakman Productions and was directed by Doug McKeon.  Most of the reviews were negative, with a minority of positive reviews.  One of the many reviews on Flixster.com was, "Sweet movie about realizing what you have and not squandering it.  A touching movie the classic coming of age city girl in the country realizing there is more to the world than malls and city fun." Another review on the movie Come Away Home, is found in the Atlanta Journal-Constitution, "Some of the acting was unprofessional but otherwise a great family movie to watch with your kids."

Camp Tanglefoot
Russell stars as the camp counselor in the movie production of Camp Tanglefoot.  He not only had a star role in the movie, he also produced it.  Camp Tanglefoot was filmed at Camp Highlander in North Carolina and was released in 1999. The film went on to win Best Children's Live Action video in 2000. According to Russell's official website, greggrussell.com, "It shocked dozens when the video sold out in four days."  The video "went gold" in the initial release, which indicates a million dollar in sales.  It has numerous children's songs written and performed exclusively by Gregg Russell himself. According to a review on Amazon.com, "The message of the video brings families heartwarming drama and good, clean entertainment."

Philanthropy

Hilton Head Heroes
Russell is cofounder and president of Hilton Head Heroes, a nonprofit charitable organization. His wife, Lindy Russell, is the other cofounder and the executive director. This philanthropic venture was started in 1998.  As reported by hhheroes.com, "Gregg was traveling around the country entertaining, and after his performances he would go to local hospitals in the area and sing for the sick children there." Gregg and Lindy adored the children and knew what a great time the kids would have if they could have a week at the beach away from the hospitals with their families; this is how Hilton Head Heroes was born. The reported mission is to help families with children ages 4–18 who suffer from serious illnesses, by providing them with a weeklong vacation away from doctors and hospital stays. Hilton Head Heroes spends approximately 1,500 dollars per family to help with lodging, meals, gas money, gift certificates, many family activities, and day camps, such as, miniature golf, boating, beach toys, and many more.  The families are housed in the Hilton Head Island HERO house located in Sea Pines Resort.  Donations from businesses and individuals keep this project running.  Lindy Russell searches for potential children and their families through the Medical University of South Carolina and Backus Children's Hospital in Savannah, Georgia.  They narrow it down by choosing families that can not afford a vacation.

Lids for Kids
Lids for Kids are another program that was started as an extension of Hilton Head Heroes.  Over the past few years, this program distributed over 1,000 baseball style hats to children that had chemotherapy treatments.

Background
Gregg Russell is originally from Alabama. His immediate family consist of, his wife, Lindy Russell, and his 3 children.

References 

People from Hilton Head, South Carolina
Living people
American children's musicians
Year of birth missing (living people)